Muriel Pletts (born 23 February 1931) is a British sprinter. She competed in the women's 4 × 100 metres relay at the 1948 Summer Olympics. Pletts' daughter, Sue Hearnshaw, won the bronze medal in the long jump at the 1984 Summer Olympics

References

External links
 

1931 births
Living people
Athletes (track and field) at the 1948 Summer Olympics
British female sprinters
Olympic athletes of Great Britain
Place of birth missing (living people)
Olympic female sprinters